Grünberg or Gruenberg (German for green mountain) may refer to:

Places
 Grünberg, Hesse, a town in Hesse
 Grünberg (St. Bernhard-Frauenhofen), a part of Sankt Bernhard-Frauenhofen, Austria
 Grünberg, the German name for Zielona Góra, Poland
 Grünberg, a part of Leopoldshagen, Mecklenburg, Western Pomerania
 Grünberg, a part of Ottendorf-Okrilla, Saxony
 Gruenberg, South Australia is now part of Moculta, east of the Barossa Valley

Other uses
 Grünberg (surname)
 Grünberg aerial tramway, in Gmunden, Austria

See also 
 Greenberg
 Grinberg, Grynberg
 Grünburg